Manuel Alberto "Né" Cunha Lopes (born 29 May 2000) is a Portuguese professional footballer who plays as a centre-back for Gil Vicente.

Career
Lopes is a youth product of Braga and Gil Vicente. He began his senior career on loan with Leça in the Campeonato de Portugal for the 2019-20 season. On 7 October 2020, he signed his first professional contract with Gil Vicente. For the 2020-21 season, he went to Espinho in the Liga 3, and returned on loan to the league the following season with Felgueiras. He made his professional debut with Gil Vicente in a 3–1 Primeira Liga loss to Benfica on 13 November 2022.

References

External links
 
 

2000 births
Living people
Sportspeople from Braga
Portuguese footballers
Leça F.C. players
Gil Vicente F.C. players
S.C. Espinho players
F.C. Felgueiras 1932 players
Primeira Liga players
Campeonato de Portugal (league) players
Association football defenders